Chiclayo is the principal city of the Lambayeque region in northern Peru.

Founded by Spanish explorers as "Santa María de los Valles de Chiclayo" in the 16th century, it was declared a city on 15 April 1835 by president Felipe Santiago Salaverry. He named Chiclayo "the Heroic City" to recognize the courage of its citizens in the fight for independence, a title it still holds. Other nicknames for Chiclayo include "The Capital of Friendship" and the "Pearl of the North".

Chiclayo is Peru's fourth-largest city, after Lima, Arequipa, and Trujillo, with a population of 738,000 as of 2011. The Lambayeque region is the fourth most populous metropolitan area of Peru, with a population of 972,713 in 2009.

The city was founded near an important prehistoric archaeological site, the Northern Wari ruins, which constitute the remains of a city from the 7th to 12th century of the Wari Empire.

Etymology
Many different historical accounts tell of the naming of Chiclayo. Some attribute it to an indigenous man known as "chiclayoc" or "chiclayep" who transported plaster between the ancient cities of Zaña, Lambayeque and Morrope.

Another version claims that around the time that the city was founded, the area was home to a green-colored fruit called chiclayep or chiclayop, which in the Mochican language means "green that hangs". In some towns in the highlands of Cajamarca, squashes are known as chiclayos, evidence that this fruit is the origin of the city's name.

Another source indicates that the word is a translation from the extinct Moche language and is derived from the word Cheqta which means "half" and yoc which means "property of".

Others say the Mochican language had words similar to the name, such as Chiclayap or Chekliayok, which means "place where there are green branches".

Symbols

Shield 

The coat of arms summarizes important features of the province, such as the one dedicated to the Virgin of the Immaculate Conception, represented in light blue background, which is a Catholic town, represented on the cross, but, also see other items related to the history, geography and landscape.

Description 

 'Tumi the tumi is a ceremonial knife used by the Lambayeque culture, represents Naylamp.
 'Sea''' the sea was always very important for its marine resources and legends that are told of it. 'Huerequeque is the typical bird of the region, is so called because in his song seems to say Huere-que-que-que.

History

Pre-Columbian cultures

Mochica culture

The Moche civilization began between the 1st and 7th centuries AD, occupying a territory that spanned much of what is now the northern coast of Peru, encompassing what is today the coastal area of the departments of Ancash, Lambayeque and La Libertad. This civilization developed a broad knowledge of hydraulic engineering: its people constructed canals to create an irrigation system in order to support agriculture. They produced surpluses, which supported population density and a strong economy for development. The culture was characterized by intensive use of copper in the manufacture of ornamental objects, tools and weapons.

During the Moche times, Pampa Grande, near Chiclayo, was a major regional capital.

The Mochicans produced ceramics with elaborate designs, representing religious themes, humans, animals, and scenes of ceremonies and myths reflecting their perception of the world. They were famous for huaco-portraits, which are preserved in museums around the country, highlighting amazing expressiveness, perfection, and realism. The civilization disappeared as a result of disasters caused by El Niño.

Sican culture

The Sican culture (or Lambayeque culture) existed between 700 and 1375AD and occupied the territory that is now the department of Lambayeque, including present-day Chiclayo.

This culture formed towards the end of the Moche civilization and assimilated much of the Moche knowledge and cultural traditions. At its peak, (900-1100), it extended over almost the entire Peruvian coast. The Sican excelled in architecture, jewelry and navigation. A thirty-year drought around the year 1020 hastened the fall of this civilization.

Colonial period

In the early 16th century, Chiclayo was inhabited by two ethnic groups; the Cinto and Collique. The chieftains of these ethnic groups donated part of their land for the construction of a Franciscan convent. This section of land was approved by the royal decree of 17 September 1585. Thus, with the advocation of Saint Maria of Chiclayo and under the direction of Father Fray Antonio of the Concepción, a church and a Franciscan convent were erected at Chiclayo. At the time of construction of these Spanish-built edifices, the city of Chiclayo was founded. Unlike other major Peruvian colonial cities such as Lima, Piura, Trujillo, or Arequipa, Chiclayo was inhabited by a largely indigenous population rather than Spanish colonizers.

Republican era
During the Peruvian War of Independence, Chiclayo supported General José de San Martín's liberating army with soldiers, weapons, horses, and other resources, under the supervision of the most progressive creole, José Leonardo Ortiz.

After independence, Chiclayo was still a small village. In 1827, Chiclayo was elevated to the level of villa.

On 15 April 1835, Chiclayo was proclaimed a city by then-president Felipe Santiago Salaverry, who declared it a "Heroic City" in recognition of the services its people rendered in the War of Independence. The next day, the Chiclayo Province was organized, with Chiclayo designated as its capital.

Modern Chiclayo
Today, Chiclayo is an important Peruvian city, the financial and commercial capital of Northern Peru. Its strategic geographic location makes it a rail, communications, and automotive hub. Modern touches include large supermarkets, banking chains, warehouses, hospitals, clinics, and galleries.

Chiclayo is also known as the "City of Friendship" and Perla del Norte ("Pearl of the North") of Perú.

 Municipal administration 
In Chiclayo, the mayor is the head of government. The mayor is democratically elected for a period of four years. Each district also has a mayor, under the supervision of the mayor of Chiclayo.  They are responsible for coordinating government administrative action in their district.

 Districts 

Central Chiclayo comprises three districts: Chiclayo, José Leonardo Ortiz, and La Victoria. Peripheral to the central city are three other districts: Pimentel, Pomalca, and Reque. Districts are subdivided into housing developments. The total land mass is 252.39 km2.

Adding Pimentel, Pomalca, and Reque to the City of Chiclayo was proposed by a 1992 urban development plan called "Chiclayo 2020". The program was superseded in 2016 by the Plan de Acondicionamiento Territorial (PAT) and Plan de Desarrollo Urbano (PDU).

 Metropolitan area 

Chiclayo is part of the metropolitan area of Chiclayo-Lambayeque. The metropolitan area comprises the six districts of Chiclayo listed above, and six others: Lambayeque, Santa Rosa, Puerto Eten, Eten City, Monsefú, and Reque. Sixty percent of the metropolitan area's population is concentrated in the six districts of Chiclayo The metropolitan area comprises central Chiclayo and adjacent areas, including the provincial capital of Lambayeque, some of which serve as bedroom communities and supply goods to Chiclayo.

Geography

Climate

Chiclayo has a warm and very dry desert climate with the sun shining all year around. Since the city of Chiclayo is located in a tropical zone near the Equator, the weather should be hot, humid, and rainy. However, it mostly resembles a subtropical climate, being comfortable and dry. This is due to the strong winds called "cyclones" that lower temperature to a moderate climate for most of the year except in the summer months where the temperature rises, so summer is often spent in resorts like Puerto Eten and Pimentel. Periodically, every 7 to 15 years, there are hotter temperatures with much higher rainfall and extreme rise of river water.

Transportation

Air

FAP Captain José Abelardo Quiñones González International Airport (IATA: CIX, ICAO: SPHI) is the main airport serving Chiclayo and the surrounding metropolitan area. It is run by ADP, a private airport operator that operates various airports in northern Peru. The airport hosts domestic airlines, international airlines flights, and fuel supply services.

Four airlines serve Chiclayo's international airport; JetSmart Perú, LATAM Perú and Star Perú offering domestic service to Lima. In July 2016, Copa Airlines began direct flights between Chiclayo and its hub in Panama, making it the first ever international flight to arrive to the city. US-based Spirit Airlines has expressed interest in serving Chiclayo from its hub in Fort Lauderdale, Florida, United States.

Land
Chiclayo, because of its location, serves as a point of interconnection for various cities of the Northeast of the country and has various bus companies which service cities such as Lima, Trujillo, Piura, Cajamarca, Chota, Cutervo, Bagua, Jaén, Chachapoyas, and Tumbes.

To adequately accommodate the transportation demand, the city is served by two different land terminals, one located towards the southern end of the city and another at the northern end on the Panamerican Highway. A substantial number of bus companies have their own terminals, many of them located near the downtown of the city and in nearby areas. These interprovincial buses contribute to the congestion experienced in downtown Chiclayo. To try to solve the problem the city government has proposed a plan to build a central station in the city.

Regionally, there are various different public services such as combis, cousters, colectivos'', which provide services within the districts and provinces of the department of Lambayeque. There are also an overwhelming number of private taxis which incessantly honk their horns throughout the downtown area of the city, causing a great deal of unwanted noise pollution.

Population

According to the Census of Population and Housing undertaken in 2007, 574,408 people inhabit the area within Chiclayo's city limits or the six municipalities. The metropolitan area has a population of 930,824; it includes other nearby cities like Monsefú and Lambayeque in a ten-minute radius by paved highway. Under the thirty-minute range are, in order of hierarchy, Ferreñafe, Santa Rosa, Eten, Illimo and Tuman. Chiclayo is at the center of the Chancay River delta, in a fertile valley.

According to the planning director of Chiclayo, by 2020 the San Jose district belonging to the Lambayeque Province will be completely integrated with the city of Chiclayo. The district has a population 12,156 inhabitants. Most of the district is conurbanized with the rest of Chiclayo.

Education and culture

University education 
The following is a list of the universities located in Chiclayo:
 Catholic University of Santo Toribio de Mogrovejo
 Private University of Juan Mejia Baca
 Señor de Sipan University
 Private University of Chiclayo
 University of Lambayeque
 San Martín de Porres University
 César Vallejo University
 Alas Peruanas University
 Federal Republic of Germany Institute
 Senati, National Industrial Training Service

note: Pedro Ruiz Gallo National University is not in Chiclayo but in near Lambayeque city,  distance.

The following is a list of museums in the area:
 Huaca Rajada – Sipan Museum
 Royal Tombs of Sipan Museum
 Sican National Museum
 Hans Heinrich Bruning National Museum
 Museum of Valley of the Pyramids of Tucume
 On Site Museum in Sipán is the newest and the smallest museum.

Tourist attractions

The department of Lambayeque is one of the most touristic in the country. It was home to the ancient civilization of the Moche who created some of the most ingenious monuments and works of art known to ancient Peru. In 1987, royal tombs of ancient Moche rulers were excavated. The artifacts found in the tomb were transferred to the Royal Tomb of Sipan Museum in the city of Lambayeque. Also there are the Brunning Museum and the Sicán Museum in Ferreñafe. These museums display the magnificent ancient artwork produced by the ancient Moche. The pyramids of Túcume are also in this area. In 2007, more than 306,000 tourists visited the museums of Lambayeque. Also in the area is the Chaparrí Ecological Reserve which has abundant biodiversity.
The department of Lambayeque boasts some of the best cuisine in Peru. The most popular dish in this area is Arroz con Pato (marinated duck with green rice). The city of Chiclayo, the capital of the department, is the second largest in the Peruvian north and has a vibrant nightlife.

 Main Park – Located in the heart of Chiclayo, was built in two sections, it has a pool equipped with three water valves which give rise to three jets of water that form the flag of Peru. Around her are shopping centers, the RENIEC, its cathedral, Hotel Royal, the Old Cinema Tropical and Colonial Theatre and republican buildings and many places where any tourist or citizen might enjoy. Its actual design, with little modification, was built in 1969, a bronze plate still in place attributes the design to Architect Carlos Garrido Lecca.
 Cathedral of Chiclayo.- Located in the main square of the city is built in neoclassical style and dates from 1869 by design and drawings of Gustave Eiffel. The cover is two bodies, supported by Doric columns first is in front of three archways. The second presents Corinthian capitals whose intercolumpios appreciate balconies or bay windows. On both sides of the facade stand steeples topped with cupolas. Inside, three bodies, highlights the sculpture of Christ poor and the home of Antonio. The cathedral building was finished near 1945; however, the bells were mounted in 1961. 
 Municipal Palace – It stood on the north side of the main park, located on Calle San Jose 823. Elegant building construction (1919), cost more than 30,000 pounds of gold; finished in 1924. It has Republican style with large windows and wrought iron gates. It was destroyed partially by a fire caused by a deplorable political brawl between the Deputy Mayor Jose Barreto Sanchez and his opponent then reinstated Mayor Arturo Castillo Chirinos, who tried to recover the position relying on a ruling of the Constitutional Court, just two months of completing the period for which he was elected in October 2006. It has been restored and is operated as a museum. The Consistorial Room is used several times a year at special ceremonies and events.
 La Verónica's Chapel – Situated at Torres Paz 294. Built at the end of the nineteenth century. Declared National Historical Monument in 1987. The altars are covered with gold plate and silver.
 Basilica San Antonio – It is situated in the intersection of streets Torres Paz and Luis Gonzales. San Antonio is home of the Discalced Fathers of Chiclayo, with modern and simple architecture (1949). The main hall is quite large, has arches and in the altar stands the crucifix articulated in polychrome wood sculpture.
 Elías Aguirre Square – Located between Calle Elias Aguirre and San Jose. This was the first place that the travelers could see when getting off the train at the Éten railway station. The statue was made by Peruvian sculptor David Lozano, its construction dates from 1924, and was erected in honor of Commander Elias Aguirre, Chiclayo hero in the Battle of Angamos of 1879.
 Municipal Library José Eufemio Lora y Lora – It has one of the largest facilities of its kind in Peru. Due to bad administration and lack of investment of any kind, its collection is extremely poor and outdated meagerly. It has no services such as a Catalog, Internet and multimedia and also lacks professional management with a year budget of under US$18,000. It has no branches (it would take four or five only in the district capital) and should be given priority and a serious investment plan. The collection is under 10,000 mostly old items, when it should be of 50.000 to 90.000 titles, organized and constantly renewed.
Centro Cívico – Civic Center – When the Éten Railway Station was closed, the land was assigned to the Civic Center. The first building was for the Chiclayo Central Mail (now SERPOST), next was the Banco de la Nación, then the Municipal Library JELyL, followed by the SUNAT building, the new Lambayeque Judicial Superior Courts, and finally, the Ministerio Público (Attorneys) of Lambayeque. It is only eight blocks West of the Main Park, near the new location of the operational Provincial Municipality of Chiclayo, now working at the Mutual Chiclayo building.
It is also home for one of the many Boy Scouts groups distributed along the city.

Twin towns – sister cities
Chiclayo is twinned with:
 Banfield, Argentina
 Bocono, Venezuela
 Cuenca, Ecuador
 Loja, Ecuador

Notable people

José Quiñones Gonzales. National aviation hero; He was born on 22 April 1914 in the District of Pimentel on the coast of the province of Chiclayo, studied his primary education at the National College San Jose City Chiclayo and then transferred to Lima and continued his secondary education at the Colegio sacred Hearts Recoleta and concluded at the National College of Our Lady of Guadalupe, then went on to serve in Peru as an Air Force pilot. Serving in the conflict against Ecuador, he was hit by Ecuadorian artillery and did not parachute from the plane to save his life, but crashed into the enemy target.
Augusto Bernardino Leguía y Salcedo. President of Perú (1908–1912 / 1919–1930); Augusto Bernardino Legui'a Salcedo (Lambayeque, 19 February 1863 – Callao, 6 February 1932) was a Peruvian politician who was President of Peru Constitutional for four periods: 1908–1912, 1919–1925 (with a transitional period prior), 1925–1929, and 1929–1930. In the last three periods, totaling eleventh consecutive year, they are known collectively as the Oncenio. Altogether ruled 15 years, being the most time Peruvian president has ruled.
Luis Castañeda Lossio. Mayor of Lima (2005–2010) (since 2015); Óscar Luis Castañeda Lossio (Chiclayo, 21 June 1945) is a Peruvian lawyer and politician, founder and president of the National Solidarity Party; Ran for presidency in the general election of 2000 Peru and Peru's general elections of 2011, ranking fifth in both occasions. He was Mayor of Lima January 2003 to October 2010, when resignation to run for a second time to the Presidency of the Republic.
Gerardo Pastor Boggiano. Visionary and Mayor of Chiclayo (1970–1974); expanded the North Avenue Balta and rebuilt in particular the lateral part of the municipality, respecting the original design. Built the Civic Center in Chiclayo, the Municipal Library building and then allowing the construction of the Post Office, National Bank that now houses the Public Ministry and the Palace of Justice. He started channeling the Acequia Cois then started building Leguia Avenue. Opened Avenue South Balta from Bolognesi and rebuilt Salaverry Avenue. He always fought for the Olmos Irrigation Project that is a reality today.
Yehude Simon Munaro. Former Minister leader of the cabinet; Yehuda Simon Munaro (* Lima, 18 July 1947 –) is a veterinarian, Peruvian sociologist and politician. The 10 October 2008 was appointed prime minister of Peru, replacing Jorge del Castillo, 1 remained in office until 11 July 2009.
Eduardo Orrego Villacorta, architect
Velásquez Quesquén. Lawyer and politician; presided Congress and was Head of Cabinet in 2009–10; Angel Javier Velásquez (* Eten, Lambayeque, Peru, 12 March 1960) is a lawyer, constitutionalist and Peruvian politician. APRA member since college, representing the constituency of Lambayeque in the Congress of the Republic of Peru since 1995. It was the Prime Minister of Peru from 11 July 2009 until 13 September 2010.
Tania Libertad, international singer

See also
 Metropolitan areas of Peru
 Lambayeque Region

Bibliography

 
 
 
 
 
 
 
 
 
 
 
 
 
 
 

 Tourism in Peru#Destinations by Department.23Lambayeque
 :es:Javier Velásquez Quesquén
 :es:Augusto Leguía

References

External links

 
Populated places in the Lambayeque Region
Populated places established in 1560
Cities in Peru
1560 establishments in the Spanish Empire
Regional capital cities in Peru